Băneasa may refer to several places in Romania:
 Băneasa, a neighborhood of Bucharest
 Băneasa Airport
 Băneasa Forest
 Zoo Băneasa
 Băneasa, Constanța, a commune in Constanţa County
 Băneasa, Galați, a commune in Galați County
 Băneasa, Giurgiu, a commune in Giurgiu County
 Băneasa, a village in Bozieni Commune, Neamț County
 Băneasa, a village in Salcia Commune, Teleorman County
 Băneasa (river), a tributary of the Chineja in Galați County
"Băneasă's Green Glade", a song written by Andy Irvine on the 1974 album Cold Blow and the Rainy Night